Bayrami, Bayramiye, Bayramiyya, Bayramiyye, and Bayramilik refer to a Turkish Sufi order (tariqah) founded by Hajji Bayram (Hacı Bayram-ı Veli) in Ankara around the year 1400 as a combination of Khalwatī, Naqshbandī, and Akbarī Sufi orders.  The order spread to the then Ottoman capital Istanbul where there were several tekkes and into the Balkans (especially Rumelia, Bosnia, Macedonia and Greece).  The order also spread into Egypt where a tekke was found in the capital, Cairo.

Influences on the other sufi orders 
Although the order today is almost nonexistent, its influence can be seen in Aziz Mahmud Hudayi founder of the Jelveti order, and the prolific writer and Muslim saint İsmail Hakkı Bursevî.

Historical evolutionary development of "Bāyrāmī" (Bāirāmee) order throughout Anatolia

See also
 Sufism
 Al Akbariyya (Sufi school)
 Wahdat-ul-Wujood
 Naqshbandiyya
 Khalwatiyya
 Zahidiyye
 Jelveti

Further reading 
 Clayer, Nathalie, Muslim Brotherhood Networks, European History Online, Mainz: Institute of European History, 2011, retrieved: May 23, 2011.
  See pp. 21–22

References 

Sunni Sufi orders
Bayramiye order
Islam in Turkey
1400 establishments in the Ottoman Empire
Religious organizations established in the 1400s
Turkish words and phrases